The Interstate Highways in Alabama are the components of the Interstate Highway System in the U.S. state of Alabama. All numbered highways in Alabama are maintained by the Alabama Department of Transportation (ALDOT).

The Interstate with the longest segment in Alabama is Interstate 65, covering ; the shortest is Interstate 359, covering . There are six Interstate primary routes and five Interstate auxiliary routes serving the six largest cities in the state, and 22 of the 25 largest.


Primary Interstate highways

Auxiliary Interstate highways

See also

References

 
Interstate